Tilpath Valley Biodiversity Park, is a 172 acre biodiversity area in the South Delhi Ridge within the Northern Aravalli leopard wildlife corridor, northwest of Asola Bhatti Wildlife Sanctuary, south of Sainik Farm.

History

Being developed since 2015, it was officially inaugurated as Delhi's third biodiversity park on 3 February 2018.

Restoration
Previously this area had the valleys dotted with sand-mined quarries, dried up springs due to lack of recharging of groundwater, no forest cover except the invasive weed species of prosopis juliflora (vilayati kikar), lantana and parthenium. During the restoration, invasive foreign species were replaced with the three layers of forest community: native trees, shrubs and grassland. Scrubland was restored to attract the reptiles and birds. In 2015, 40,000 volunteers planted over 100,000 trees within 6 hours. In 2016, 20,000 trees were planted by the volunteers again.

Flora
The park now has the grasslands, hilly terrain with over 105 tree and shrubs species. Native species include mahua, haldu, sheesham and bael.

Fauna
In 2016, the park was teeming with over 103 bird species, 32 butterflies species, 15 herpetofauna (reptiles and amphibians) species and eight mammalian species including leopard, hyena, Indian rock python, jackals, neelgai, mongooses, porcupines, small Indian civet, gecko, Sirkeer malkoha cuckoo, nightjar, Indian paradise flycatcher. Wildlife surveys are conducted using pugmarks tracking with the pug impression pad (PIP) and by photographing the wild animals. Further reintroductions of mammalian megafaunas such as chinkara, chital deer, hog deer, has been proposed.

See also
 Delhi Ridge
 Tilpat
 National Parks & Wildlife Sanctuaries of Haryana
 Biodiversity Park, Visakhapatnam

References 

Wildlife sanctuaries in Delhi
South Delhi district
2015 establishments in Delhi
Protected areas established in 2015